The coat of arms of Ploiești consist of a blue shield, loaded with two golden lions, with a red tongue, which sustain a silver, uprooted oak tree. Everything is put on a red scarf with the inscription of M.V.V. initials. The shield is stamped by a mural silver crown made up of seven notched towers.

The meaning of all the elements:
the representation, took over from Michael the Brave's seal as ruler of the three Romanian countries, reminds about the fact that he founded the city;
the initials M.V.V. represent the abbreviation of the words Mihai Viteazul-Voievod.

References

Ploiesti
Ploisti
Ploisti